Esconites is a genus of eunicid polychaete known from concretions in the Carboniferous Mazon Creek biota (Essex fauna).

It reaches 4–14 cm in length and has 23-80 segments and distinctive jaw elements.

References

Errantia